La Morandière-Rochebaucourt is a municipality in the Canadian province of Quebec, located in the Abitibi Regional County Municipality.

The municipality also includes the hamlets of La Maurandière, Rochebaucourt, Castagnier and Lac-Castagnier.

History

The location where La Morandière currently sits was initially settled in around 1916 by Émilien Plante, Uldéric Hardy and Charles Rochette but the territory didn't have any official status until January 1, 1983, the date when the municipality of La Morandière was founded.

In 1935 as part of the Vautrin Settlement Plan, Rochebaucourt was colonized by pioneers from Saint-Antoine-sur-Richelieu, Saint-Hyacinthe, and Salaberry-de-Valleyfield. It was first known as Colonie-33 but this was quickly replaced by Rochebaucourt, the name of the geographic township in which it is located. La Rochebaucourt was a cavalry captain of the Régiment de Languedoc in General Montcalm's army. In 1940, the Parish of Saint-Antoine-de-Rochebaucourt was established.

In 2022, it was decided to merge the two municipalities to form the new Municipality of La Morandière-Rochebaucourt.

Demographics
Population trend:
 Population in 2021 (La Morandière): 205 (2016 to 2021 population change: -1.0%)
 Population in 2016 (La Morandière): 207 
 Population in 2021 (Rochebaucourt): 146 (2016 to 2021 population change: 11.2%)
 Population in 2016 (Rochebaucourt): 131 

Mother tongue:
 English as first language: 0%
 French as first language: 98.6%
 English and French as first language: 1.4%
 Other as first language: 1.4%

Municipal council
 Mayor: Alain Trudel
 Councillors: Louisette Dumas, Sylvie Leclerc, Michelle Sénéchal, Marc-Antoine Pelletier, Rémi Plamondon, Christiane Blouin

References

Municipalities in Quebec
Incorporated places in Abitibi-Témiscamingue